The flag of Missouri, often referred to as the Missouri flag, is the state flag of the U.S. state of Missouri. It consists of three equal horizontal tribands of red, white, and blue stripes, with the arms of Missouri in the center. Designed by Mary Elizabeth Oliver, the red and white stripes, as is traditional, represent valor and purity, respectively. The blue represents three things: the permanency, vigilance, and justice of the state. The three colors also highlight the French influence on the state in its early years. The Missouri flag was established on March 22, 1913, when governor Elliot Woolfolk Major signed the State flag act making it official.

History 
The design of the State flag has been modified officially once since 1861. The current version is the longest-used and has been in use for more than  years.

First flag 

Missouri did not have an official flag until Major-General Sterling Price, commander of the Missouri State Guard, ordered on June 5, 1861:

  Each regiment will adopt the State flag, made of blue merino, 6 by 5 feet, with the Missouri coat-of-arms in gold gilt on each side.

Flag Act of 1913 
The Missouri state flag was designed and stitched in Cape Girardeau, Missouri, by Marie Elizabeth Oliver, the wife of former State Senator R. B. Oliver. She began her flag project in 1908 as part of her volunteer activities with the Daughters of the American Revolution (DAR) when she was appointed chairperson of the DAR committee to research and design Missouri's flag. Oliver researched state flags extensively. She wrote each state's secretary of state for information about how their state's flags had been designed and officially adopted. Her original design incorporated Missouri's coat of arms and was rendered as a painted paper flag by her friend Mary Kochitzky.

The flag was brought to the Missouri State Capitol in 1908 and bills to adopt the flag as the official flag of Missouri were introduced by Senator Arthur L. Oliver, her nephew, in 1909 and 1911. Both bills failed to pass in the House. A competing flag design, by Dr. G.H. Holcomb and referred to as the "Holcomb flag", was opposed due to its resemblance to the Flag of the United States and its lack of Missouri symbolism. Oliver's original paper flag was destroyed when the Missouri State Capitol burned in 1911. With Mrs. S.D. MacFarland, Oliver sewed a second flag out of silk. Her design was adopted on March 22, 1913, when governor Elliot Woolfolk Major signed the Oliver Flag Bill. The flag design remains unchanged to this day. The silk flag was kept by Marie Oliver until 1961 when her son Allen gave it to the state of Missouri. The flag was displayed until it began to deteriorate and was put into storage. In 1988, Secretary of State Roy D. Blunt issued a challenge to elementary students to raise money to restore the flag. The campaign was successful and the restored flag has been displayed in the James C. Kirkpatrick State Information Center in Jefferson City ever since.

The Oliver-Leming House, also known as the Home of the Missouri State Flag, was listed on the National Register of Historic Places in 1980.

Design 
The flag is a tricolor consisting of three horizontal stripes of red, white and blue which resembles the flag of the Netherlands. These represent valor, purity, vigilance, and justice. The colors also reflect the state's historic status as part of French Louisiana. In the center white stripe is the seal of Missouri, circled by a blue band containing 24 stars, symbolizing Missouri's admission as the 24th U.S. state. The flag also includes the state seal which says  “Salus Populi Suprema Lex Esto” which translates into “The health (welfare, good, salvation, felicity) of the people should be the supreme law”. The flag is described in Section 010.020 of Missouri's Revised Statutes. There are no known examples of mass-produced Missouri state flags in compliance with the RSMo due to the 7:12 proportions.

It is one of two U.S. state flags to feature a bear, the other being that of California.

In 2001, the North American Vexillological Association surveyed its members on the designs of the 72 U.S. state, U.S. territorial and Canadian provincial flags. The Missouri flag ranked in the bottom 25, 48th out of the 72.

See also  

 List of flags by design
 List of Missouri state symbols
 List of U.S. state, district, and territorial insignia
 Flag of Kansas City
 Flag of St. Louis

Notes

References

External links 

 
 The Missouri State Flag at Missouri Secretary of State

 
1913 establishments in Missouri
Daughters of the American Revolution
Missouri
Missouri
Flag
Missouri